Jorge Suárez may refer to:

 Jorge Suárez (field hockey) (born 1942), Argentine Olympic hockey player
 Jorge Suárez Cáceres (born 1976), Puerto Rican politician
 Jorge Suárez (footballer) (1945–1997), soccer player from El Salvador
 Jorge A. Suárez (1927-1985), Argentinian linguist